The GMA T.50 or Gordon Murray Automotive Type 50 is a sports car manufactured by Gordon Murray Automotive. Designed by Gordon Murray and inspired by the McLaren F1, the T.50 is powered by an all-new bespoke  naturally aspirated V12 engine developed by Cosworth.

The GMA T.50's main competitors are the Aston Martin Valkyrie and the Mercedes-AMG One.

Aerodynamics

A distinctive feature of the GMA T.50 is the 8.5 kW 40 cm aerodynamic fan integrated into the rear of the car, powered by a 48 volt electrical motor. Inspired by the Brabham BT46B Formula One car, it is purpose-built to significantly improve the ground effect of the T.50. As the T.50 makes use of very aggressive and steep angled rear diffusers, this in turn creates substantial turbulent or semi-stalled air passing over the diffuser when the T.50 has its fan inactive. By utilising the integrated aerodynamic fan, the T.50 can suck the air under the car at a 90-degree angle and provide a significant increase in overall downforce as it provides a laminar flow of air passing over the rear diffuser, thus, creating a greater level of suction in tandem with the Venturi effect, created underneath the car, ahead of the steep rear diffusers. This allows the T.50 to control the boundary layer and turbulent vortices underneath the car, significantly improving downforce. As a result of the T.50’s fan-assisted aerodynamic design, the need for any aerodynamic package on the front or rear of the T.50, such as a splitter, a wing or an aggressive aerodynamic design are considered ineffective in providing further downforce and are thus considered negligible, allowing a free form and flowing exterior design. The T.50 does make use of active aero spoilers however, that operate in conjunction with the aerodynamic fan. The active aero and fan functionality of the car is dependent on the driver selected mode which is provided in six presets made available in the cockpit of the car. The fan assisted aero design allows for a 30% increase in downforce when a 'high downforce' mode is selected, channeling air through aero ducts perpendicular to the airflow underneath the car, providing a high suction ground effect. Furthermore, under braking the T.50 provides 100% additional downforce by extending the active spoilers to a 45-degree angle of attack and utilising diffuser ducts. The T.50 can also achieve reductions in drag by selecting the specialised mode presets of 'streamline' and 'Vmax' modes, allowing for a 12.5% reduction in overall drag.

Comparisons to the McLaren F1
The car has been noted for its numerous similarities to the McLaren F1, produced between 1992 and 1998, which Gordon Murray conceptualised and co-designed. The T.50 has been described by Gordon Murray Automotive as being the "spiritual successor to the Murray-devised McLaren F1". The T.50 shares familiar features of the F1: a centralised driving position with two passenger seats flanking the driver, a six-speed manual gearbox, V12 powertrain, ticket passenger windows, dihedral wing doors as well as fan assisted ground-effect aerodynamics.

The T.50 addresses many of the design and engineering inadequacies of the 90’s supercar, many of those the result of period design practices and time and budget constraints enforced by McLaren. As recorded by Murray "the spine is 50 mm too wide, the headlamps are like glow worms in a jar, the air-con was hopeless, the brakes squeak, the clutch needs adjusting every 5,000 miles, the fuel tank bag replacing every five years, loading luggage in the lockers was a pain. This all stuck in my head".

Production
GMA plans to build 100 customer cars at its Surrey production site. Each car cost £2.36 million before local taxes and all of the planned 100 road spec units were sold within 48 hours of its global premiere. As of August 2020 there are to be 13 GMA T.50 prototypes to pass crash, durability and emission regulations.

Performance 
The GMA T.50 has a 0-62 of 2.8 seconds and a top speed of 217 mph.

Variants 
There will be 25 racing variants of the car, designated as the Gordon Murray Automotive T.50S Niki Lauda, each with a price of £3.1 million (before taxes). It has reduced its weight by 134 kg giving the car a weight of 852 kg. Additions include a 1784mm wide delta wing on the rear, underbody aerofoil, new front splitter and adjustable diffusers which give the car 1500 kg of downforce. The engine has its power boosted to beyond 700PS, an aero fin is added which extends from the roof to the rear of the car and the underbody diffusor ducts are fully opened with the fan permanently running at 7000rpm.

See also 
 McMurtry Spéirling, a 2021 prototype electric car which also uses fans for added downforce.

References

External links

Sports cars
Cars introduced in 2020
Coupés
First car made by manufacturer
Rear mid-engine, rear-wheel-drive vehicles
Gordon Murray Automotive Type 50